The Reliance Foundation Development League is India's first developmental football league organised by the Reliance Foundation in technical support with the All India Football Federation. A total of eight teams participated in the first tournament which was held in Goa from 15 April to 12 May 2022. The reserve teams of the Indian Super League clubs Bengaluru FC, Chennaiyin FC, FC Goa, Jamshedpur FC, Kerala Blasters FC, Mumbai City FC and Hyderabad FC joined Reliance Foundation Young Champs (RFYC) for the inaugural edition. The league was founded to offer opportunities to the young players across the country.

Background
In June 2021 it was proposed by the organisers of ISL after a meeting with the CEOs of all the ISL clubs, that a new developmental league, called Reliance Foundation Development League, would be introduced in 2022. This new league would consist of the youth and reserve teams of all the ISL clubs, with aim to develop young players as there has been limited number of competitions and leagues outside the ISL since the pandemic. The teams would predominantly feature U-21 players with few overage players allowed as well. The inaugural season of the proposed two-month league will be held in Goa inside a bio-secure bubble between January and March, following the same medical and safety procedures for 2021–22 ISL season, but got postponed to April 15.

Player selection

born after January 1, 2001
permission to include five players born on or after January, 1999, no more than three players are allowed in the playing XI
maximum of 24 players
no foreign nationals

Teams (2022)
Bengaluru FC
Chennaiyin FC
FC Goa
Jamshedpur FC
Kerala Blasters FC
Mumbai City FC
Hyderabad FC
Reliance Foundation Young Champs (RFYC)

See also
Junior National Football Championship
Football in India
Indian football league system
Youth League

References

 
Youth football leagues
2022 establishments in India
Professional sports leagues in India
Football leagues in India
Reliance Sports
Reliance Foundation Development League
Youth football in India